Ward Charcoal Ovens State Historic Park is an area designated for historic preservation and public recreation located  south of the town of Ely in White Pine County, Nevada. The  state park protects beehive-shaped charcoal ovens constructed in the latter half of the 19th century.

History
Ovens
The charcoal ovens are associated with the silver mining ghost town of  Ward, Nevada, established in 1876. The town at its peak had a population of 1500, two newspapers, a school, fire department, two smelters and a stamp mill. The town declined after 1880, with a fire in 1883 destroying a third of the town. The post office closed in 1888. Mining revived briefly in the 1930s and 1960s. The town has been mostly destroyed by repeated flash flooding in its low-lying site. Only the smelter, mill foundations and a cemetery are left.

The charcoal ovens are two miles to the south of the townsite. The ovens were in operation from 1876 through 1879. They were built of quartz latite welded tuff by itinerant Swiss Italian masons who specialized in the ovens, who were known as carbonari. The beehive shape was designed as a more efficient version of the open-pit system that originated in Italy. The charcoal ovens prepared charcoal from locally harvested timber for use in the smelters at Ward, using 30 to 60 bushels of charcoal per ton of ore, for 16,000 bushels a day. The Ward ovens are the best-preserved of their kind in Nevada. They were listed in the National Register of Historic Places in 1971.

Park
The area was under private ownership and management until 1956, when the Nevada State Park Commission was offered a permit to protect the ovens. Two privately owned parcels were transferred to the Nevada Department of Wildlife in 1968, and in 1969, 160 acres were transferred to the state park system to create a state monument. The area was designated a state park in 1994, when recreational facilities were added to the site.

Activities and amenities
The park offers camping, picnicking, and trails for hiking and mountain biking.

References

External links

Ward Charcoal Ovens State Historic Park Nevada State Parks
Ward Charcoal Ovens State Historic Park Trail Map Nevada State Parks

 

State parks of Nevada
Charcoal ovens
Buildings and structures in White Pine County, Nevada
History of White Pine County, Nevada
Industrial buildings and structures on the National Register of Historic Places in Nevada
Protected areas of White Pine County, Nevada
National Register of Historic Places in White Pine County, Nevada
Protected areas established in 1969
Great Basin National Heritage Area
Industrial buildings completed in 1876
1876 establishments in Nevada